Dag is a masculine Scandinavian given name derived from the Old Norse dagr, meaning "day" (or the name of the god Dagr, a personification of the day), most commonly used in Norway and Sweden. In Sweden, September 16 is Dag's Name Day.  Dag is uncommon as a surname.  People with the name Dag include:

Given name

 Dag Terje Andersen (b. 1957), Norwegian politician
 Dag Arnesen (b. 1950), Norwegian jazz musician 
 Dag Arvas (1913–2004), Swedish Navy rear admiral
 Dag Berggrav (1925–2003), Norwegian jurist, civil servant and sports administrator
 Dag Bjørndalen (b. 1970), former Norwegian biathlete
 Dag Fornæss (b. 1948), Norwegian, former speed skater
 Dag Frøland (1945–2010), Norwegian comedian, revue artist and singer
 Dag Gundersen (1928–2016), Norwegian linguist and lexicographer
 Dag Hammarskjöld (1905–1961), Swedish UN General Secretary (1953–1961)
 Dag Hartelius (b. 1955), Swedish diplomat 
 Dag Herbjørnsrud (b. 1971), Norwegian, former editor-in-chief of the Norwegian weekly news magazine Ny Tid
 Dag Heward-Mills (b. 1963), Ghanaian Christian evangelist and author
 Dag Ingebrigtsen (b. 1958), Norwegian musician 
 Dag Juhlin (b. 1962), American musician
 Dag Larsson (born 1960), Swedish politician
 Dag Otto Lauritzen (b. 1956), Norwegian cyclist
 Dag Alexander Olsen (b. 1989), Norwegian footballer 
 Dag Palovic (b. 1975), Slovakian Pokerstars Team Pro Member
 Dag Erik Pedersen (b. 1959), Norwegian cyclist 
 Dag Prawitz (b. 1936), Swedish philosopher and logician
 Dag Ringsson (?–?), Norwegian, member of Olav Haraldsson's army at the battle of Stiklest
 Dag Schjelderup-Ebbe (1926–2013), Norwegian musicologist, composer, music critic and biographer
 Dag Solstad (b. 1941), Norwegian author
 Dag Spantell (b. 1950), Norwegian singer 
 Dag Volle (1963–1998) (Denniz Pop), Swedish pop music producer
 Dag Wennlund, (b. 1963) Swedish javelin thrower
 Dag C. Weberg (b. 1937), Norwegian politician
 Dag Wirén (1905–1986), Swedish composer

Nickname
 "Dags", Daryl Somers, an Australian television personality
 "DAG", David Alan Grier's nickname based on his initials.

Surname
 Burcu Dağ (born 1981), Turkish para-archer
 Ekrem Dağ (born 1980), Turkish football player
 Şevket Dağ (born 1876), Turkish artist and politician

Fictional characters
 Dag Redwing Hickory, male protagonist of Lois McMaster Bujold's series of novels "The Sharing Knife"
Rick "Dag" Dagless, a character on the TV series Garth Marenghi's Darkplace
 Daggett Doofus Beaver, a cartoon character from Nickelodeon TV Series "The Angry Beavers"
 Dag Daughtry, a character in Jack London's novel Michael, Brother of Jerry
The Dag, a character in the 2015 film Mad Max: Fury Road
 Dag, the main antagonist of Barnyard

References

Scandinavian masculine given names
Masculine given names
Norwegian masculine given names
Swedish masculine given names
Danish masculine given names